HNLMS Koningin Wilhelmina der Nederlanden was a unique protected cruiser of the Royal Netherlands Navy built by the Rijkswerf in Amsterdam.

Design
It had  deck armour. The ship's main armament was a single  gun. Secondary armament included a single  gun and two single  guns.

Service history
The ship was built at the Rijkswerf in Amsterdam and named after Queen Wilhelmina of the Netherlands, who attended the launch ceremony and christened the ship on 22 October 1892. After the liquidation of the original builder, the Koninklijke Fabriek van Stoom- en andere Werktuigen in Amsterdam, construction of the ship was taken over by the Rijkswerf.

She entered service on 17 April 1894. From 14 July to 2 August she carried out see trials in the North Sea and Atlantic Ocean. During these trials she ran aground on the island of Harssens on 19 July while leaving the harbor of Den Helder, due to a broken steam engine.
Before the ship left for the Dutch East Indies, Queen Wilhelmina and her mother visited the ship on 12 September 1894.

On 10 December 1896 she left for a journey from Batavia to China, Korea, Japan and the Philippines to show the flag.

In 1900 the ship together with the coastal defence ship  and the protected cruiser  was sent to Shanghai to safeguard European citizens and Dutch interests in the region during the Boxer Rebellion. A landing party from the cruiser Holland assisted in the defense of the Shanghai French Concession where many Dutch citizens where present. Koningin Wilhelmina der Nederlanden and Holland returned to the Dutch East Indies on 9 October. On this journey they visited Amoy and Swatow. They arrived in Tanjung Priok on 6 November.

The ship started its last journey on 29 December 1909 from Sabang to IJmuiden, where she arrived on 14  February 1910. Later that year, on 5 March, she was decommissioned and on 14 October was sold to Frank Rijsdijk's Scheepssloperij for scrapping at Hendrik-Ido-Ambacht.

Notes

References
Staatsbegrooting voor het dienstjaar 1902 (VI. 2.)

External links
Description of ship
Pictures of the ship on maritiemdigitaal.nl
Nederlandse Mariniers in China (Dutch marines in China) (nl)

Cruisers of the Royal Netherlands Navy
19th-century naval ships of the Netherlands
1892 ships